Free All the Monsters is the eighth full-length album by New Zealand band The Bats, released in 2011.

Recording and release
In December 2010, The Bats recorded tracks for the album at a backpackers and stables at the old Seacliff Asylum, between Oamaru and Dunedin. The album was recorded and co-produced by Dale Cotton, who had produced Robert Scott's recent solo album.

The album was released on 15 October 2011. In New Zealand, The Bats reunited with their old label Flying Nun. Internationally the album was released by Mistletone Records in Australia, Revolver/Midheaven Distribution in the U.S.A, and Forte Distribution in the U.K. & Europe.

Reception
The album has been praised by critics in New Zealand and internationally.  Tim Sendra of Allmusic said, 'The Bats have managed to maintain a ridiculously high level of quality throughout their career, and Free All the Monsters is as good a record as they’ve ever made."  It was described by Pitchfork as "...their best record in years, possibly ever".

The album was shortlisted for the 2012 Taite Music Prize.

Track listing

Personnel
Malcolm Grant - drums
Paul Kean - backing vocals, bass
Robert Scott - vocals, guitar, keyboards
Kaye Woodward - vocals, guitar

Also credited:
Alan Starrett - viola, dulcimer ("Long Halls")
John Egenes - mandolin ("Free All the Monsters")
Dale Cotton - engineer, co-producer

References

The Bats (New Zealand band) albums
2011 albums
Flying Nun Records albums
Dunedin Sound albums